Lilongwe River is a river in Malawi, it flows through Lilongwe, the capital of the country.

The river is approximately 200 km long. It flows into Lake Malawi.

Rivers of Malawi
Lilongwe